Esmail Khoi (30 June 1938 – 25 May 2021) was an Iranian poet and writer. He was living in the United Kingdom after being exiled from Iran during the 1980s. Khoi was originally a lecturer in Philosophy before the Iranian Revolution. He was a member of the Iranian Writers' Association. His poems have been translated in many languages, including English, French, Russian, German and Ukrainian. He wrote a poetry book in English called "Voice of Exile", "What is shall be what is not". He is the first Iranian writer to be awarded the Coburg Rückert Prizen for literature, which he received in 2010.

Selected bibliography
Edges of Poetry:Selected Poetry (Blue Logos Press, 1995)
Outlandia:Song of Exile (Nik Publishers, 1999)

References

External links
Listen to Esmail Khoi reading his poetry - a British Library recording, 24 February 2009.

1938 births
2021 deaths
20th-century Iranian poets
Iranian emigrants to the United Kingdom
People from Mashhad
Iranian Writers Association members
21st-century Iranian poets